This is a list of classic vessels around the world. These are veteran vessels being maintained or restored with the aim of keeping them in operation. Many are in use for regular sailings, cruises or on a charter basis. They can be owned privately, by public bodies or by preservation groups. This list does not include museum ships, and the vessels listed are not necessarily on static display – for these, see list of museum ships.

See also
Barcelona Charter
 List of former museum ships

References

External links
List of Maritime Museums in Britain and Ireland including Non-Museum Vessels

Lists of ships